Even Vengshoel (11 November 1891 – 6 October 1968) was a Norwegian athlete. He competed in the men's individual cross country event at the 1920 Summer Olympics.

References

External links
 

1891 births
1968 deaths
Athletes (track and field) at the 1920 Summer Olympics
Norwegian male long-distance runners
Olympic athletes of Norway
People from Oppland
Olympic cross country runners
Sportspeople from Innlandet